The International German Piano Award is a yearly international music competition for classical piano music since 2011. The International Piano Forum is the initiator and organizer of the competition.

The prize money amounts to a total of 20,000 euros and aims to support outstanding Pianists. A first international jury elects and nominates pianists under notary procedure. A second jury then votes for the Laureate of the International German Piano Award. 
The following support of the nominated provides concerts at concert halls and contacts to conductors as well as orchestras. The International Piano Forum supports furthermore the production of CDs, websites and an artist portfolio. In the last years, the Grand Finale took place at the Alte Oper in Frankfurt am Main.

Patrons
Valery Gergiev
Peter Ramsauer
Petra Roth
Lars Vogt

Laureates
 2011: Amir Tebenikhin
 2012: Lukas Geniusas
 2013: Dmitri Levkovich - The Audience-Award went to Thomas Wypior
 2014: Misha Namirovsky - The Audience-Award went to Albertina Eunju 
 2015: Yekwon Sunwoo - The Audience-Award went to Andrejs Osokins
 2016: Wataru Isasue
 2017: Eric Lu - The FAZ-Audience-Award went to Eric Lu
 2018: Hans H. Suh - The FAZ-Audience-Award went to Tomoki Sakata
 2019: JeungBeum Sohn - The FAZ-Audience-Award went to Luka Okros
 2021: Dmitry Ablogin

Audience Awards
2013: Thomas Wypior
2014: Albertina Eunju Song
2015: Andrejs Osokins
2017: Eric Lu
2018: Tomoki Sakata
2019: Luka Okros

Nominated pianists 2011–2017 
2011
 Nareh Arghamanyan,
 Joseph Moog,
 Christopher Park,
 Amir Tebenikhin,
 Hélène Tysman,
 Anna Winnitskaja,

2012
 Ah Ruem Ahn,
 Lukas Geniusas,
 Andrey Gugnin,
 Toghrul Huseynli,
 Ho Jeong Lee,
 Igor Levit,
 Dudana Mazmanishvili,
 Igor Tchetuev,

2013
 Gábor Farkas,
 Viviana Lasaracina,
 Dmitri Levkovich,
 Alexey Pudinov,
 Edoardo Turbil,
 Thomas Wypior,

2014
 Valentina Babor,
 David Gray,
 Lindsay Garritson,
 Misha Namirovsky,
 Jie Yuan,
 Albertina Eunju Song,
 
2015
 François Dumont,
 Ching-Yun Hu,
 Alexander Lubyantsev,
 Maria Mazo,
 Andrejs Osokins,
 Yekwon Sunwoo,
 Georgy Tchaidze,
 Andrew Tyson,
 Irene Veneziano,
 Alexander Yakovlev,

2017
 Moye Chen,
 Zhenni Li,
 Eric Lu, 
 Fabio Martino,
 Jiayan Sun,
 Alexander Yakovlev

2018
Alexei Melnikov
Tomoki Sakata
Hans H. Suh
Antonina Suhanova
Alexey Sychev
Amadeus Wiesensee

2019
Sergey Belyavskiy
Lika Bibileishvili
Sahun Hong
Rodolfo Leone (Could not participate due to an illness)
Luka Okros
JeungBeum Sohn

Members of the jury since 2011

 Ogtay Abasguliyev, Azerbaidschan
 Conrad van Alphen, Netherlands
 Paul Badura-Skoda, Austria
 Maurizio Baglini, Italy
 Eleonore Büning, Germany
 Alexander Buhr, Germany
 Hung-Kuan Chen, USA
 Paul Dan, Germany
 Gaetan Le Divelec, Great Britain
 Josep Caballé Domenech, Spain
 Thomas Duis, Germany
 Gudni Emilsson, Island
 Enrico Fischer, Germany
 Norma Fisher, Great Britain
 Renchang Fu, People's Republic of China 
 Lukas Geniusas, Russia
 Petras Geniusas, Lithuania
 Bernd Goetzke, Germany
 Giorgi Jordania, Georgia
 Milton Rubén Laufer, USA
 Dmitri Levkovich, Ukraine
 David Lively, USA-France
 Alexei Ljubimow, Russia
 Wolfgang Manz, Germany
 Jura Margulis, Russia
 Siegfried Mauser, Germany
 Rudolf Meister, Germany
 Pablo Mielgo, Spain
 Dariusz Mikulski, Poland
 Ekaterina Murina, Russia
 Michael Ponti, USA
 Jorge Luis Prats, Kuba
 Wojciech Rajski, Poland
 Frederic Anthony Rzewski, Belgium
 Georg Friedrich Schenck, Germany
 Wolfram Schmitt-Leonardy, Germany
 Reinhard Seehafer, Germany
 Lior Shambadal, Israel
 Yekwon Sunwoo, South Korea
 Alexander Tchaikovsky, Russia
 Amir Tebenikhin, Kazakhstan
 Pieter Van Winkel, Netherlands
 Catherine Vickers, Germany
 Boian Videnoff, Bulgaria
 Sebastian Weigle, Germany
 Gregor Willmes, Germany
 Andrea Zietzschmann, Germany

References

2011 establishments in Germany
Piano competitions